Charles Emmanuel, Landgrave of Hesse-Rotenburg (Karl Emanuel; 5 June 1746 – 23 March 1812) was landgrave of Hessen-Rotenburg between 1778 and 1812. He was named after his uncle Charles Emmanuel III of Sardinia, husband of his aunt Polyxena of Hesse-Rotenburg.

Biography
He was born in Langenschwalbach, the son of Constantine, Landgrave of Hesse-Rotenburg (24 May 1716 – 30 December 1778) and Sofie von Starhemberg (October 1722 – 12 December 1773).

He died in Frankfurt in 1812.

Marriage and issue
Karl Emanuel married Princess Leopoldina Maria Anna Francisca de Paula Adelgunda (Vienna, 30 January 1754 – Frankfurt, 16 October 1823), daughter of Franz Josef I, Prince of Liechtenstein, on 1 September 1771 in Felsberg. The couple had two children.

Victor Amadeus (2 September 1779 – 12 November 1834) named after Victor Amadeus III of Sardinia
Marie Adelheid Klotilde  (12 September 1787 – 6 January 1869); married Prince Karl August of Hohenlohe-Bartenstein (1788–1844) named after Clothilde of France

Karl also had an illegitimate son by Lucie Juliane Struve (b. 1769), daughter of Johann Conrad Struve:

Ernst von Blumenstein (11 February 1796 – 25 August 1875)

Karl's only descendants were from his illegitimate line.

Ancestry

References 

1746 births
1812 deaths
People from Bad Schwalbach
House of Hesse-Kassel
18th-century German people
19th-century German people
Landgraves of Hesse-Rotenburg